Liquid Air EP is the second EP by German electronic band Air Liquide, which was released in 1992.

Track listing

Side A
 "Liquid Air"
 "Revelation"
 "Liquid Air (Bionaut Remix)"

Side B
 "Liquid Men With Liquid Hearts"
 "Psy 9"
 "Liquid Air (Xenon Remix)"

1992 EPs
Air Liquide (band) albums